Sunny Summer is a special extended play (EP) by South Korean girl group GFriend. The album is marketed as their first special "summer" EP. It was released by Source Music on July 19, 2018, and distributed by kakao M (formerly LOEN Entertainment).

Composition 
The album contains five songs, including the eponymous title track, "Sunny Summer," described by Billboard as having "airy, exuberant vocals that bounce along over the melody, [the song] is driven by the group's refreshing vocals tones as they sing about having a memorable summer together."

Track listing

Charts

Weekly charts

Year-end charts

Sales

References

2018 EPs
Korean-language EPs
GFriend EPs
Kakao M EPs
Hybe Corporation EPs